Drezno may refer to the following places:
Drezno, the Polish name for Dresden, Germany
Drezno, Masovian Voivodeship (east-central Poland)
Drężno, West Pomeranian Voivodeship (north-west Poland)